Annakara is a village in Thrissur district in the state of Kerala, India. Located on the western bank of Kechery river, it was earlier a border village, located near the junction of Malabar region of Madras presidency and Kochi kingdom.  Annakara village comes under Mullassery Grama Panchayat.  Chirakkal Bagavathy temple is located in this village.

Demographics
 India census, Annakara had a population of 8125 with 3851 males and 4274 females.

References

Villages in Thrissur district